"Irgendwo Anders" (engl. Somewhere Else) is a song by German alternative band Jennifer Rostock, released on 11 June 2010. The song was written by Jennifer Weist and Johannes Walter.

Song
The song is a mid-tempo rock ballad. Lyrically, it is about two persons realising that their relationship is no longer working.

Track listing

Music video
The music video was released on 10 March 2010 on the band's MySpace profile.

Charts

Personnel
Jennifer Weist - Vocals
Johannes "Joe" Walter - Keyboard
Alex Voigt - Guitar
Christoph Deckert - Bass
Christopher "Baku" Kohl - Drums

References

2010 songs